Plasmodium buteonis is a parasite of the genus Plasmodium subgenus Giovannolaia.

Like all Plasmodium species P. buteonis has both vertebrate and insect hosts. The vertebrate hosts for this parasite are birds.

Taxonomy
The parasite was first described by Paperna et al. in 2007. P. buteonis cannot be distinguished from some others of the same subgenus  P. gabaldoni and
P. homocircumfexum  and may in fact not be a valid name.

Distribution
This parasite is found in Israel.

Hosts
P. buteonis infects the common buzzard  (Buteo buteo).

References

buteonis
Parasites of birds